Norwich is an unincorporated community in western McHenry County, North Dakota, United States. It lies along U.S. Route 2 southwest of the city of Towner, the county seat of McHenry County. Norwich's elevation is 1,549 feet (472 m). It is unincorporated, and had a post office with the ZIP code of 58768.  Though the post office closed May 4, 1996, the ZIP code is still valid for use.

Norwich was founded in 1901 and named after Norwich, England in an effort to please Great Northern Railway stockholders from England. It was one of several sites along the Great Northern's transcontinental route between Devils Lake and Minot that were named after places in England (the others were Berwick, Leeds, Penn, Rugby, Surrey, Tunbridge, and York).

The community is part of the Minot Micropolitan Statistical Area.

References

Unincorporated communities in McHenry County, North Dakota
Unincorporated communities in North Dakota
Minot, North Dakota micropolitan area
Populated places established in 1901
1901 establishments in North Dakota